The 2015 Wisconsin–Whitewater Warhawks football team was an American football team that represented the University of Wisconsin–Whitewater as a member of the Wisconsin Intercollegiate Athletic Conference (WIAC) during the 2015 NCAA Division III football season. Led by first-year head coach Kevin Bullis, the Warhawks compiled an overall record of 12–2 and a mark of 6–1 in conference play, placing second in the WIAC. They advanced to the NCAA Division III Football Championship playoffs, losing in the semifinals to Mount Union, the eventual national champions.

Schedule

References 

Wisconsin–Whitewater
Wisconsin–Whitewater Warhawks football seasons
Wisconsin–Whitewater Warhawks football